Neogobius is a genus of goby native to Black Sea and the Caspian Sea basins. It is part of the broader Benthophilinae subfamily which is also endemic to the same region. Nevertheless, two Neogobius species have recently turned out to be highly invasive and spread across Europe and even to the Great Lakes of North America.

Species
There are currently four recognized species in this genus:

 Neogobius caspius (Eichwald, 1831) (Caspian goby)
 Neogobius fluviatilis (Pallas, 1814) (Monkey goby)
 Neogobius melanostomus (Pallas, 1814) (Round goby)
 Neogobius pallasi (Berg, 1916) (Caspian sand goby)

Of these, N. bathybius, N. caspius and N. pallasi are endemic to the Caspian basin. N. fluviatilis is a sister species of N. pallasi in the Black Sea basin. N. melanostomus, the round goby, is native to both basins, and is the most aggressively spreading fish to exotic watersheds.

References

 
Ray-finned fish genera
Taxonomy articles created by Polbot